The Istanbul Mineral and Metals Exporters' Association (IMMIB) is a professional body which deals with all of the export activities at the export density regions of Istanbul. It is affiliated with the Undersecretariat for Foreign Trade of the office of the Prime Minister of Turkey. As of 2008 IMMIB's 25,300 members represented one third of Turkey's total exports.

Promotional activity
IMMIB has promoted Turkish stone as a product and was represented at Coverings 2004 with a major display.

Organisation

IMMIB is made up of six subsidiary associations, namely:

 Istanbul Mineral Exporters' Association
 Istanbul Ferrous and Non-Ferrous Metals Exporters' Association
 Istanbul Chemicals and Chemical Products Exporters' Association
 Istanbul Electrical, Electronics and Machinery Products Exporters' Association
 Istanbul Precious Minerals and Jewellery Exporters' Association
 Istanbul Iron and Steel  Exporters' Association

Objectives

The function and objectives of Istanbul Mineral and Metals Exporters' Association are to:

 Maximise Turkey export potential by undertaking studies on harmonization of types, qualities and quantities of exportable products with importing countries' needs;
 Resolve problems faced by members arising from legal transactions;
 Register and record exportation in relevant sectors and to produce statistics based on these records;
 Prepare records and to make in-depth analysis of relevant sectors prepare market reports for selected markets and carry out R&D activities;
 Examine foreign trade regulations and laws of importer countries and keep member firms informed about international rules of arbitration;
 Organise seminars, fairs and exhibitions to introduce Turkish export products to world markets, produce documents concerning export operations and foster cooperation with other organisations considered key partners in achieving Association's objectives and organise trade missions to potential export markets and to bring buyer missions into Turkey in cooperation with Undersecretary for Foreign Trade;
 Prepare conferences and courses to inform exporters about the improvements.

References

External links
 IMMIB Official Website

Government of Turkey
Economy of Istanbul
Professional associations based in Turkey
Mineral and Metals Exporters' Association
Foreign trade of Turkey
Metal industry